The Große Pyhrgas is a mountain in the Ennstal Alps on the border between Upper Austria and Styria.
At a height of  it is the highest summit and western buttress of the Haller Mauern range.

Alpine huts on the Großer Pyhrgas are, on the Upper Austrian side, the Hofalm Hut (1,305 m), the Rohrauerhaus (1,308 m) and the Bosruck Hut (1,036 m).

References

Sources 
Gerald Radinger: Wandererlebnis Kalkalpen. Die 50 schönsten Touren im Nationalpark. Residenz Verlag, 2009,

External links 
 Photographs of the Großer Pyhrgas

Mountains of the Alps
Mountains of Styria
Mountains of Upper Austria
Two-thousanders of Austria
Ennstal Alps